Bells on Sunday is a short radio programme transmitted on BBC Radio 4. It currently airs at 5:43 AM every Sunday, and is repeated at 12:45 AM the following Monday, and features bell ringers ringing the changes. The recordings come from a different church tower within the United Kingdom each week.

External links
BBC page Listen to last bells
Bells On Sunday Diary. Each show with information about the bells going back to 2002.
 Archive of Bells featured on the programme (since 2014)] 
Page on Ringing World website with information on how to submit recordings

BBC Radio 4 programmes
Campanology
British religious radio programmes